Marko Šutalo (born April 13, 1983) is a Serbia-born Bosnian professional basketball player. He is a 1.94 m (6 ft 5 in) tall shooting guard who currently plays for Conlog Baskets Koblenz of the fourth-tier German 1. Regionalliga.

Career
Šutalo began his professional career began in 1999 with KK Topola from his hometown. In the period between 2001 and 2009 he spent between two Novi Sad clubs - KK Novi Sad where he played five seasons and KK Vojvodina where he played three. Along with playing basketball he was also studied law.

He moved to Hemofarm Vršac in 2009 and spent there three years making his first performances in European competitions in the Eurocup and Euroleague qualifications. In July 2012 he moved to HKK Široki of the Bosnian-Herzegovinian League. In October 2013 he signed with the Croatian KK Zadar for the rest of the season. In July 2014, he signed with the Romanian team BCM U Pitești. In July 2015, he signed with the new promoted Romanian team Dinamo București.

An offensive-minded guard, Šutalo is a pure shooter with an ability to drain triples and long jumpers. In 2008–09, playing for KK Vojvodina in his native Serbia, Sutalo put himself on the map when he shot a staggering 52% behind the three-point arc for the season in 26 Adriatic league games. While his defence is somewhat of a liability, his trigger from downtown, coupled with athleticism that allows him to drive through the paint, always make him a great threat. Such traits have finally earned him a call to represent Bosnia and Herzegovina, where his father was born.

References

External links
 Marko Šutalo at aba-liga.com
 Marko Šutalo at eurobasket.com
 Marko Šutalo at fiba.com

1983 births
Living people
ABA League players
Basketball League of Serbia players
Bosnia and Herzegovina men's basketball players
Bosnia and Herzegovina people of Serbian descent
Croats of Bosnia and Herzegovina
CSU Pitești players
HKK Široki players
KK Hemofarm players
KK Novi Sad players
KK Vojvodina Srbijagas players
KK Zadar players
People from Bačka Topola
Serbian expatriate basketball people in Bosnia and Herzegovina
Serbian expatriate basketball people in Croatia
Serbian expatriate basketball people in Germany
Serbian expatriate basketball people in Romania
Serbian men's basketball players
Serbian people of Bosnia and Herzegovina descent
Shooting guards